HMS Stayner  was a British  of the Royal Navy in commission during World War II. Originally constructed as a United States Navy , she served in the Royal Navy from 1943 to 1945.

Construction and transfer
The ship was laid down as the unnamed U.S. Navy destroyer escort DE-564 by Bethlehem-Hingham Shipyard, Inc., in Hingham, Massachusetts, on 22 September 1943 and launched on 6 November 1943. She was transferred to the United Kingdom upon completion on 30 December 1943.

Service history

Commissioned into service in the Royal Navy as the frigate HMS Stayner (K573) on 30 December 1943 simultaneously with her transfer, the ship served on patrol and escort duty. On 5 August 1944, she joined the British destroyer  in a depth charge attack which sank the German submarine  in the English Channel south of Brighton, England, at 0200 hours at position .

The Royal Navy decommissioned Stayner later in 1945 and returned her to the U.S. Navy on 24 November 1945.

Disposal
The United States sold Stayner on 14 November 1947 for scrapping.

Citations

External links
Photo gallery of HMS Stayner (K-573)
Destroyer Escort Sailors Association DEs for UK
Captain Class Frigate Association HMS Stayner K573 (DE 564)
  Schnellboot 1939/1940 ships 

 

Captain-class frigates
Buckley-class destroyer escorts
World War II frigates of the United Kingdom
Ships built in Hingham, Massachusetts
1943 ships
Royal Navy ship names